Nemipterus japonicus, commonly known as the Japanese threadfin bream, is a marine fish native to the Pacific and Indian Oceans. The species now also occurs in the Mediterranean, having invaded as a Lessepsian migrant through the Suez Canal. It is consumed by humans as an ingredient of crab sticks.

References

japonicus
Fish of the Indian Ocean
Fish of the Pacific Ocean
Fish of Thailand
Fish described in 1791
Taxa named by Marcus Elieser Bloch